Maslennikov is a surname. It may refer to:

Aleksei Maslennikov (born 1929), Russian tenor
Igor Maslennikov (born 1931), Russian film director
Igor Maslennikov (footballer, born 2001), Russian professional football player
Ivan Maslennikov (1900–1954), General of the Army, Soviet military and NKVD commander during World War II
Oleg Maslennikov (born 1971), retired Russian professional footballer
Sergey Maslennikov (born 1982), Russian Nordic combined skier who has competed since 2002

See also
 Masļenki border incident

Russian-language surnames